Bowe is an English and Irish surname. In Ireland it represents at least one distinct family, the surname originally Ó Buadhaigh meaning victorious. People with this name include:

 Kaycee Bowe (Wildlife  Rehabilitation), born 1994, Australia
 Alice Bowe, English garden designer
 Brittany Bowe, American speed skater
 Dante Bowe, American Christian musician
 David Bowe (actor) (21st century), American film actor
 David Bowe (politician) (born 1955), British politician
 Dwayne Bowe (born 1984), American football wide receiver
 Frank Bowe (1947–2007), disability rights activist, author, and teacher
 John Bowe (actor) (born 1950), English television actor
 John Bowe (author) (born 1964), American journalist
 John Bowe (soccer) (1911–1990), Australian rules soccer 
 John Bowe (racing driver) (born 1954), Australian racing driver
Kelly Bowe (born 1965) American screenwriter
 Len Bowe (born 1885), Australian rules soccer 
Philip Paul Bowe (born 1930) American labor lawyer 
 Riddick Bowe (born 1967), American boxer
 Rosemarie Bowe (born 1932), American film and television actress
 Tommy Bowe (born 1984), Irish rugby union footballer

Given name
 Bowe Bergdahl US Soldier captured in Afghanistan in July 2009

Places
Bowé, in Guinea

See also

 Bow (disambiguation)
 Bowes (disambiguation)
 Bowie (disambiguation)